Karla Conway (born July 5, 1946 in Pasadena, California) was the name used by the American model and artist Karla Jo Musacchia for her appearance as Playboy magazine's Playmate of the Month for its April 1966 issue. 

She now uses the name Sachi and has become an artist. Due to her concern for the environment, she created a turtle logo for companies to use for bags that they make that are both biodegradable and compostable.

See also
 List of people in Playboy 1960–1969

References

External links
 
 

1946 births
Living people
People from Pasadena, California
1960s Playboy Playmates